Bradyrhizobium rifense is a bacterium that was isolated from nodules of Cytisus villosus from the Moroccan Rif.

References

 

Nitrobacteraceae
Bacteria described in 2012